The 2010–11 season was the 105th season in Atlético Madrid's history and their 74th season in La Liga, the top division of Spanish football. It covers a period from 1 July 2010 to 30 June 2011.

Atlético Madrid competed for their tenth La Liga title and participated in the UEFA Europa League as holders, entering in the Group stage due to their seventh-place finish in the 2010–11 La Liga. They also entered the Copa del Rey in the quarter-finals, where they were eliminated by eventual winners Real Madrid.

Kits 
Supplier: Nike / Main Sponsor: Kia Motors / Back Sponsor: Kyocera / Shorts Sponsor: Paf

Transfers 
In (summer):

 Filipe Luís: €12m from Deportivo La Coruña

 Diego Godín: €8m from Villarreal

 Fran Mérida: Free from Arsenal

 Diego Costa: From Valladolid

 Mario Suárez: From RCD Mallorca

In (winter):

 Juanfran: €4m from Osasuna

 Elías: From Corinthians

Out (summer):

 José Manuel Jurado: €13m to Schalke

 Pablo Ibanez: Free to West Brom

 Mariano Pernía: To Nacional

Out (winter):

 Simão: €0.9m to Beşiktaş

 Ignacio Camacho: To Malaga

 Juanito: Free to Valladolid

Squad

Competitions

UEFA Super Cup

La Liga

League table

Matches

Copa Del Rey

Round of 32

Round of 16

Quarter-finals

UEFA Europa League

Group stage

External links 
  

Atletico Madrid
Atlético Madrid seasons
Atletico Madrid